

This is a timeline of Syrian history, comprising important legal and territorial changes and political events in Syria and its predecessor states.  To read about the background to these events, see History of Syria.

 Millennia: 1st BC1st–2nd3rd 
 Centuries: 1st2nd3rd4th5th6th7th8th9th10th11th12th13th14th15th16th17th18th19th20thSee alsoFurther reading

1st century BC

1st century

2nd century

3rd century

4th century

5th century

6th century

7th century

8th century

9th century

10th century

11th century 

‘'Poet 'Al Maari' writes 'The Epistle of Forgiveness' amongst other great works.'’

12th century

13th century

14th century

15th century

16th century

17th century

18th century

19th century 

Massacre of Aleppo
1860 Mount Lebanon civil war

20th century

21st century

See also
Cities in Syria
 Timeline of Aleppo
 Timeline of Damascus
 Timeline of Hama
 Timeline of Latakia

References 
 BBC – Syria timeline
 timelines.ws Extensive timeline – thru 2010, 2011-

Further reading

External links
 

Syrian
Syrian history timelines
Years in Syria